542 East State Street, also known as the William Wall House, is a historic building in Savannah, Georgia, United States. It is located in the northeastern tything of Greene Square and was built  (although a plaque on its front states it was the home of Joseph Ryan in 1791). It is part of the Savannah Historic District. It was originally built for William and Charlotte Wall, leaders in the Second African Baptist Church.

See also
Buildings in Savannah Historic District

References

Houses in Savannah, Georgia
Houses completed in 1818
Greene Square (Savannah) buildings
Savannah Historic District